The Mantrap is a 1943 American mystery film directed by George Sherman and written by Curt Siodmak. The film stars Henry Stephenson, Lloyd Corrigan, Joseph Allen, Dorothy Lovett, Edmund MacDonald and Alice Fleming. The film was released on April 13, 1943, by Republic Pictures.

Plot
After being first at the scene of an accident, retired crime expert from Scotland Yard, Sir Humphrey Quilp, is given a “birthday present” of the fun of solving the crime by the Assistant District Attorney who is already sure of the identity of the murderer.  Over the objections of his family, Quilp takes on the task using old fashioned logic and the knowledge of human nature instead of modern (1943) methods like fingerprints and microscopes.  At the end of the day Quilp has revealed the killer, redeemed the innocent, and proved that he still has what it takes even if he is ready for a rest.

Cast   
Henry Stephenson as Sir Humphrey Quilp
Lloyd Corrigan as Anatol Duprez
Joseph Allen as Eddie Regan
Dorothy Lovett as Jane Mason
Edmund MacDonald as Assistant District Attorney Knox
Alice Fleming as Miss Mason
Tom Stevenson as Robert Berwick
Frederick Worlock as Patrick Berwick
Jane Weeks as Miss Woolcott

References

External links
 

1943 films
1940s English-language films
American mystery films
1943 mystery films
Republic Pictures films
Films directed by George Sherman
American black-and-white films
1940s American films